756 Naval Air Squadron (756 NAS) was a Naval Air Squadron of the Royal Navy's Fleet Air Arm. It was initially formed as a Telegraphist Air Gunner Training Squadron, operating from March 1941, out of RNAS Worthy Down (HMS Kestrel), in Hampshire, England. TAG training was provided until the No. 2 School was ready in Canada, opening on the 1 January 1943, and 756 NAS disbanded in December 1942. The squadron reformed at RNAS Katukurunda (HMS Ukussa), in Sri Lanka, in October 1943, as a Torpedo, Bomber, Reconnaissance pool. During 1944 and 1945, the squadron undertook a number of detachmemts on different types of Royal Navy aircraft carriers, with it disbanding in December 1945.

History of 756 NAS

Telegraphist Air Gunner Training Squadron (1941 - 1942) 

It operated with Proctor I and II, a British radio trainer and communications aircraft.

The squadron continued Telegraphist Air Gunner training throughout 1942, however, as part of the British Commonwealth Air Training Plan, the No. 2 Telegraphist Air Gunner School, at R.N. Air Section Yarmouth , located in Yarmouth County, Nova Scotia, Canada, opened on 1 January 1943, and therefore 756 NAS was disbanded at Worthy Down on the 1 December 1942.

Torpedo Bomber Reconnaissance (1943 - 1945) 

756 Naval Air Squadron reformed on the 1 October 1943 as a Torpedo Bomber Reconnaissance pool at RNAS Katukurunda (HMS Ukussa), located near the town of Kalutara in Sri Lanka. The squadron initially used Albacore, a single-engine biplane torpedo bomber, and Fulmar, a British carrier-borne reconnaissance aircraft/fighter aircraft, from reformation. These were followed by Barracuda, a British carrier-borne torpedo and dive bomber, in the December. In February 1944, Albacore and Fulmar were withdrawn from the squadron's inventory, but Swordfish, a biplane torpedo bomber aircraft, arrived in March 1944 and these were closely followed by Avenger, an American torpedo bomber aircraft, in May.

The squadron participated in four separate aircraft carrier deployments, one during 1944 and a further three in 1945. From the 29 April to the 4 May 1944, a detachment from 756 NAS, was deployed on the aircraft repair ship and light aircraft carrier,  HMS Unicorn (I72).

In 1945, a detachment then spent three days, 1, 2 and 3 May, operating from the Attacker-class escort carrier, HMS Attacker (D02) and this was later followed by a two week detachment to the Ruler-class escort carrier, HMS Atheling (D51), between the 15 and the 21 August. 756 NAS sent a detachment to the Illustrious-class aircraft carrier, HMS Victorious (R38) for approximately two weeks, from 29 October to the 12 November.

On the 24 November 1945, 756 NAS disbanded at RNAS Katukurunda.

Aircraft flown 

756 Naval Air Squadron has flown a number of different aircraft types, including:
Percival P.28 Proctor IA (Mar 1941 - Dec 1942)
Percival P.30 Proctor IIA (Mar 1941 - Dec 1942)
de Havilland (DH.82A) Tiger Moth II (Dec 1941 - Jun 1942)
Fairey Albacore Mk I (Oct 1943 - Feb 1944)
Fairey Fulmar Mk.II (Oct 1943 - Feb 1944)
Fairey Barracuda Mk II (Dec 1943 - Nov 1945)
Fairey Barracuda Mk III (Dec 1943 - Nov 1945)
Fairey Swordfish I (Mar 1944 - Feb 1945)
Grumman Tarpon GR.I (May 1944 - Nov 1945)
Grumman Avenger Mk.II (May 1944 - Nov 1945)

Naval Air Stations  and Aircraft Carriers 

756 Naval Air Squadron operated from a couple of naval air stations of the Royal Navy, one in England and one overseas in Sri Lanka, and some Royal Navy aircraft carrier deployments  (Dt.= Detachment):
Royal Naval Air Station WORTHY DOWN (6 Mar 1941 - 1 December 1942)
Royal Naval Air Station KATUKURUNDA (1 October 1943 - 24 November 1945)
HMS Unicorn Dt. (29 April 1944 - 4 May 1944)
HMS Attacker Dt. (1 May 1945 - 3 May 1945)
HMS Atheling Dt. (15 August 1945 - 21 August 1945)
HMS Victorious Dt. (29 October 1945 - 12 November 1945)

Commanding Officers 

List of commanding officers of 756 Naval Air Squadron with month and year of appointment and end:

1941 - 1942
Lt-Cdr(A) R. H. Ovey, RNVR (Mar 1941-Jun 1942)
Lt-Cdr(A) W. H. C. Blake, RNVR (Jun 1942-Dec 1942)

1943 - 1945
Lt-Cdr A. D. Bourke, RNZNVR (Oct 1943-Feb 1944)
Lt(A) W. D. Widdows, RNVR (Feb 1944) (temp)
Lt-Cdr(A) S. M. deL. Longsden, RN (Feb 1944-Oct 1944)
Lt-Cdr(A) T. T. Miller, RN (Oct 1944-Jul 1945)
Lt-Cdr(A) R. E. F. Kerrison, RNVR (Jul 1945-Aug 1945)
Lt-Cdr(A) F. W. Barring, RNVR (Aug 1945-Nov 1945)

References

Citations

Bibliography

700 series Fleet Air Arm squadrons
Military units and formations established in 1941
Military units and formations of the Royal Navy in World War II